Wierzchowski (feminine: Wierzchowska; plural: Wierzchowscy) is a Polish surname. It is a toponymic surname referring to Wierzchy, a name given to various villages in Poland.  The surname  Notable people with the surname include:

 Jakub Wierzchowski (born 1977), Polish footballer
 Letícia Wierzchowski (born 1972), Brazilian writer
  (born 1958), Polish photographer
  (born 1949), Polish physicist
  (born 1949), Polish monarchist
  (born 1929), Polish biologist
  (born 1927), Polish motorcyclist
  (born 1926), Polish politician
  (born 1896), Polish commissar
  (born 1888), Polish chemist
  (born 1860), Polish esperantist

See also
 

Polish-language surnames